Scanorama was the award-winning inflight magazine of SAS. It was one of the magazines produced by SAS.

Scanorama was established in 1972. Twelve issues were released yearly. The publisher was DG Communications AB based in Stockholm. It was published in English. One of the editors-in-chief was Naljen Ståhlström. The magazine had approximately two million readers each month. The magazine was shut down in 2014 and was replaced by Scandinavian Traveler in November 2014.

See also
SAS Media

Notes

External links
 WorldCat record

1972 establishments in Sweden
2014 disestablishments in Sweden
Defunct magazines published in Sweden
Inflight magazines
Magazines established in 1972
Magazines disestablished in 2014
Magazines published in Stockholm
Monthly magazines published in Sweden
Scandinavian Airlines